Michael Onwenu (born December 10, 1997) is an American football guard for the New England Patriots of the National Football League (NFL). He played college football at Michigan.

College career
Playing at Cass Technical High School, Onwenu was the top-ranked recruit in the state of Michigan for his class and committed to Michigan over Alabama, Ohio State and others. He played on both the offensive line and defensive line his freshman year before spending the final three years of his career at right guard, starting the final two and earning third-team all-Big Ten Conference honors his junior and senior seasons.

Professional career

New England Patriots
Onwenu was drafted by the New England Patriots in the sixth round (182nd overall) in the 2020 NFL Draft.

During the early portion of his rookie season, Onwenu played across the offensive line after injuries affected the normal lineup; Onwenu took snaps as a sixth offensive lineman/jumbo tight end, at right tackle, and at both guard positions. After starting the first two games as a sixth offensive lineman, Onwenu made his first career start at left guard against the Las Vegas Raiders. He helped the Patriots amass 250 rushing yards in a 36–20 victory. Despite alternating between guard and tackle, Onwenu finished the year ranked as one of the best offensive linemen in the NFL and started all 16 Patriots games.

Following the departure of Joe Thuney and the acquisition of Trent Brown, Onwenu moved to left guard for the 2021 season, however Onwenu struggled and was benched in favor of Ted Karras and finished the season as a backup guard and often being used as a sixth offensive lineman.

The 2022 season was a bounce back season for Onwenu as he moved to right guard as rookie Cole Strange was the starting left guard, Onwenu impressed at the position, being PFF's No. 4 ranked guard.

Personal life
Onwenu is of Nigerian descent; his parents were born in Nigeria but later moved to the United States.

References

External links
Michigan Wolverines bio
New England Patriots bio

1997 births
Living people
American sportspeople of Nigerian descent
American football offensive guards
American football offensive tackles
Michigan Wolverines football players
New England Patriots players
Players of American football from Detroit
Cass Technical High School alumni